The Keres Defence (also known as the Kangaroo Defence or Franco-Indian Defence) is a chess opening characterised by the moves:

1. d4 e6
2. c4 Bb4+

The opening is named after Estonian grandmaster Paul Keres.

History
This opening was known since the 1840s and was played by Henry Thomas Buckle in his fourth match game with Johann Löwenthal, London 1851. The standard reply today, 3.Bd2, was recommended by Howard Staunton.

Discussion
White can respond 3.Nc3, 3.Nd2, or 3.Bd2. The game often transposes to a Nimzo-Indian Defence, a Dutch Defence, a Queen's Gambit Declined, an English Defence, or a Bogo-Indian Defence. 3.Nc3 is likely to transpose into one of those openings: 3...Nf6 (Nimzo-Indian), 3...f5 (Dutch; Korn gives 3...Bxc3+ 4.bxc3 f5!, played by Buckle) 3...d5 (an unusual form of QGD), or 3...b6 (English). Black has the same options after 3.Nd2, except that 3...Nf6 4.Nf3 is a Bogo-Indian.

After 3.Bd2, Black can continue with 3...Bxd2+ into a line of the Bogo-Indian, and 3...a5 will also usually transpose to a Bogo-Indian when White plays Nf3. Or Black can allow White to play e4: 3...Qe7 4.e4 d5 (Black obtained a good game in Llanos–Hoffman, San Luis Clarin 1995 with 4...Nf6 5.a3 Bxd2+ 6.Nxd2 d6 7.Bd3 e5 8.d5 0-0) 5.Bxb4 (5.e5 Timman–Spraggett, Montpellier 1985) Qxb4+ 6.Qd2! Qxd2+ (if 6...Nc6 then 7.Nc3!) 7.Nxd2 with slight advantage for White.

See also
 List of chess openings
 List of chess openings named after people

References

Bibliography

Chess openings